Grabill is a form of the surname Graybill. It may refer to

 Grabill, Indiana, a town in Cedar Creek Township, Allen County, Indiana
 John C. H. Grabill (1849–1903), American photographer
 Ropp-Grabill House, an historic house in the Irving Park neighborhood of Chicago, Illinois